Anne C. Stone is an American anthropological geneticist and a Regents' Professor in the School of Human Evolution and Social Change at Arizona State University. Her research focuses on population history and understanding how humans and the great apes have adapted to their environments, including their disease and dietary environments. Stone is a Fellow of the American Association for the Advancement of Science and a Member of the National Academy of Sciences.

Education 
Stone completed her undergraduate degree in Biology and Archaeology at the University of Virginia. In 1989, she moved to Pennsylvania State University for her doctoral studies in Anthropology with George Milner and Mark Stoneking. Her doctoral research included the largest genetic analysis of a pre-historic Native American population, from the 700-year old Norris Farms cemetery in Illinois. In 1992, she was awarded a Fulbright scholarship to spend a year at the Ludwig Maximilian University of Munich working with the famous paleogeneticist Svante Pääbo. During this time, she conducted ancient DNA analyses of Ötzi, the Tyrolean Ice Man. Stone graduated with her doctoral degree in 1996 and joined the University of Arizona as a National Institutes of Health NRSA postdoctoral scholar to work alongside Michael Hammer.

Career and research 
Stone joined the University of New Mexico as an assistant professor in 1999 and later moved to Arizona State University in 2003 as an associate professor. Stone became a full professor in 2010  and was selected as a Regents' Professor in 2017.

Stone is an expert in the field of ancient DNA research, especially on the population history of the Americas. Research in the Stone Lab focuses on three main themes: (a) Native American population history, (b) the evolutionary history of the Great Apes, and (c) understanding the co-evolutionary history of mycobacteria (specifically Mycobacterium tuberculosis and Mycobacterium leprae, the causative agents of tuberculosis and leprosy, respectively) with human and non-human primates. 

Stone's work has contributed greatly to understanding of how infectious diseases such as tuberculosis have evolved over time.  She has used ancient DNA to understand the evolutionary history of Mycobacterium tuberculosis, the pathogen which causes tuberculosis. In 2014, Stone co-led a study, along with paleogeneticist Johannes Krause, bioarchaeologist Jane Buikstra, and others, which found that prehistoric Native American people were infected by a strain of M. tuberculosis transmitted by pinnipeds, such as seals, sometime between 1,000 and 3,000 years ago. This surprising discovery was reported in the journal Nature, and indicated that prehistoric Native Americans were infected by an animal strain of M. tuberculosis that rarely infects people today and which was later replaced by strains brought over by Europeans after the Age of Discovery. Stone's work on tuberculosis allows us to understand the patterns of mutation responsible for allowing the bacterium to adapt to different hosts, which can provide insight into future drug design. 

In 2016, Stone was part of a team that showed it was possible to reconstruct complete human mitochondrial genomes from ancient human dental calculus. This finding opened up the possibility of using dental calculus as a source for studying ancient biomolecules from the host. In 2018, Stone led a study describing how strains of Mycobacterium leprae, the pathogen that causes leprosy, can be passed from humans to nonhuman primates and vice versa. 

Additionally, Stone has worked on the L-gulonolactone oxidase gene, which is associated with the production of Vitamin C in primates. At some stage in the evolution of primates, L-gulonolactone oxidase became inactive, and Stone's research has tried to understand how and why this happened. Stone has also developed new techniques that allow her to extract DNA from degraded or burnt bones, which could allow the identification of victims of forest fires. 

Stone is a Senior Editor for the journal Molecular Biology and Evolution. She joined the Executive Committee of the American Association of Physical Anthropologists in 2016.

Awards and honors 
 2007: Kavli Foundation Scholar
 2010: Arizona State University Faculty Exemplar Award
 2011: Fellow of the American Association for the Advancement of Science
 2013: President of the American Association of Anthropological Genetics
 2016: Elected as a Member of the National Academy of Sciences (NAS)
 2018: Outstanding Alumni Award, Department of Anthropology, Pennsylvania State University
 2022: Guggenheim Fellowship

References 

Arizona State University faculty
Fellows of the American Association for the Advancement of Science
Living people
Members of the United States National Academy of Sciences
Pennsylvania State University alumni
University of Virginia alumni
Year of birth missing (living people)